Olivier Léveillé (born 15 March 2001) is a Canadian cross-country skier.

Career

Junior
At the 2020 Nordic Junior World Ski Championships in Oberwiesenthal, Germany, Léveillé was part of the quartet who won silver in the 4 × 5 kilometre relay event, becoming the first Canadians to win a relay medal at the event. The following year Léveillé won bronze in the 10 kilometre freestyle event, becoming only the third Canadian to win an individual medal in the history of the event.

Senior
Léveillé made his senior debut as part of the 2021–22 FIS Cross-Country World Cup in Ruka, Finland. Léveillé's top placement was a 17th-place finish in the 15 km event (6th fastest time of the day).

On January 13, 2022, Léveillé was officially named to Canada's 2022 Olympic team.

Cross-country skiing results
All results are sourced from the International Ski Federation (FIS).

Olympic Games

Distance reduced to 30 km due to weather conditions.

World Championships

World Cup

Season standings

References

External links

 

2001 births
Living people
Canadian male cross-country skiers
Sportspeople from Sherbrooke
Cross-country skiers at the 2022 Winter Olympics
Olympic cross-country skiers of Canada